Egmond is a former municipality in the north-western Netherlands, in the province of North Holland. In 2001, it was merged with the municipalities of Schoorl and Bergen to form the municipality of Bergen. The three main villages in the  former municipality are Egmond aan den Hoef, Egmond aan Zee and Egmond-Binnen. The place gave its name to the House of Egmond, who became the powerful protectors of Egmond Abbey, founded in the 9th-century in Egmond-Binnen, and who built their residence (hoeve/hoef) in Egmond aan den Hoef.

The French philosopher René Descartes, author of Meditations on First Philosophy, lived in both Egmond aan den Hoef and (mostly) Egmond-Binnen from April 1636 to September 1638 and again from May 1643 until the end of September 1649 before leaving for Sweden (where he died 4 months later). His Les Météores, La Dioptrique and La Géométrie were published in the first period and his letters to Elisabeth of the Palatinate and Les Passions de l'âme were from the second period. Descartes lived longer in Egmond than in any other place in his life.

References

Municipalities of the Netherlands disestablished in 2001
Former municipalities of North Holland